The Central District of Delijan County is a district (bakhsh) in Delijan County, Markazi Province, Iran. At the 2006 census, its population was 43,388, in 12,578 families.  The District has two cities: Delijan and Naraq. The District has four rural districts (dehestan): Do Dehak Rural District, Hastijan Rural District, Jasb Rural District, and Jushaq Rural District.

References 

Delijan County
Districts of Markazi Province